Robert Carl Oldis (born January 5, 1928) is a scout for the Miami Marlins of American Major League Baseball and a former professional baseball player and coach.

Biography
Oldis was a catcher whose playing career lasted for 15 seasons, 1949–63. As a Major Leaguer, he appeared in 135 games as a second- or third-string receiver over all or parts of seven seasons (1953–55; 1960–63) with the Washington Senators, Pittsburgh Pirates and Philadelphia Phillies. He was a member of the 1960 World Series champion Pirates squad that beat the New York Yankees, serving as the club's third catcher behind Smoky Burgess and Hal Smith. Although he got into only 22 games during the 1960 season (three as a starting catcher), Oldis appeared in Games 4 and 5 of the World Series as a defensive replacement, spelling Burgess, but had no plate appearances. The Pirates won both contests, however, and went on to a seven-game upset on Bill Mazeroski's walk-off home run. Oldis' greatest number of games played was 47, in his final major league season.

For his MLB career, Oldis hit .237 with one home run—hit off Pete Richert of the Los Angeles Dodgers on August 9, 1962—along with 22 runs batted in and 56 hits. Following his playing career, he was a coach for the Phillies (1964–66), Minnesota Twins (1968) and Montreal Expos (1969), and scouted for the Phils and Expos. He has been associated with the Marlins since 2002.

References

External links

1928 births
Living people
Baseball players from Iowa
Charlotte Hornets (baseball) players
Chattanooga Lookouts players
Columbus Jets players
Denver Bears players
Emporia Nationals players
Major League Baseball bullpen coaches
Major League Baseball catchers
Major League Baseball first base coaches
Miami Marlins scouts
Minnesota Twins coaches
Montreal Expos coaches
Montreal Expos scouts
People from Preston, Iowa
Philadelphia Phillies coaches
Philadelphia Phillies players
Philadelphia Phillies scouts
Pittsburgh Pirates players
Richmond Virginians (minor league) players
Washington Senators (1901–1960) players